Heinrich Raphael Eduard Freiherr von Handel-Mazzetti (19 February 1882 in Vienna – 1 February 1940) was an Austrian botanist best known for his many publications on the flora of China and botanical explorations of that country. He was the cousin of novelist Enrica von Handel-Mazzetti (1871-1955).

Life
He studied botany at the University of Vienna, obtaining his doctorate in 1907. From 1905 he served as an assistant at the botanical institute in Vienna. In 1925 he was appointed curator to the Natural History Museum.

His earlier research involved scientific excursions to Switzerland (1906), Bosnia and Herzegovina (1909), followed by an expedition to Mesopotamia and Kurdistan (1910). On behalf of the Austrian Academy of Sciences, he traveled to China in 1914, performing botanical research in the provinces of Yunnan (1914, 1915, 1916), Sichuan (1914), Guizhou (1917), Hunan (1917, 1918), and Kweichow. In China he also undertook cartographic surveys. He returned to Vienna in 1919, and devoted his time and energy to the study of Chinese flora.

He was the author of Naturbilder aus Südwest-China : Erlebnisse und Eindrücke eines österreichischen Forschers während des Weltkrieges (1927), later translated into English as "A botanical pioneer in South West China : experiences and impressions of an Austrian botanist during the First World War".

There are streets named after Handel-Mazzetti in the Austrian towns of Kremsmünster, St. Pölten, Schwanenstadt, Steyr, Wels and Wieselburg as well as the cities of Linz and Vienna.

References

External links
Entry in the Österreichisches Biographisches Lexikon 1815–1950 

20th-century Austrian botanists
Scientists from Vienna
Pedestrian road incident deaths
Road incident deaths in Austria
1882 births
1940 deaths